Francis Gordon Wilson (27 November 1900 – 23 February 1959) was an Australian born,  New Zealand architect. Wilson oversaw the design of New Zealand’s state housing programme from the 1930s onwards. He was the New Zealand Government Architect at the time of his death.

Early life and education 
Wilson was born on 27 November 1900 in Subiaco, a district of Perth, Western Australia to Mary Catherine (nee O’Hagan) and Francis "Frank" John Wilson. His father was a New Zealander by birth while his mother was of Irish descent. The couple had a second son, Leslie, who was born in 1902.
The family moved to New Zealand to attend a family reunion and due to the possibility of Wilson’s father obtaining the commission to design the Palmerston North Opera House. The family moved to New Zealand in 1903, and made their home in Wellington. The marriage did not last and Frank Wilson returned to Australia (where he later remarried), leaving his sons to be raised by their mother. Mary ran a boarding house in Ghuznee Street to support herself and her children. Gordon was educated at the Terrace School and at Wellington Technical College.

Career
Upon leaving school Wilson was articled in 1916 to Wellington architect William M. Page.

In 1920 Wilson began working for the Wellington-based architectural partnership of Hoggard, Prouse and Gummer. He transferred within the business to Auckland where he continued his architectural studies by studying part-time at the Auckland University College School of Architecture.  Hoggard left the partnership in 1921, leaving Prouse and Gummer in partnership until its dissolution in 1923. Auckland-based William Gummer subsequently formed a new partnership in 1924 with Reginald Ford called Grummer and Ford. The new partners employed Wilson first as a draughtsman and later as chief draughtsman.

Wilson subsequently completed his professional examinations in 1928 and was admitted to the New Zealand Institute of Architects (NZIA). 
After gaining his professional qualifications Wilson in the company of an architect friend  travelled to the United States where he spent  six months exploring California, with the exception of a mule-back tour of the Grand Canyon. The onset of the Depression caused him to return home where he took up an associate partnership with Gummer and Ford.

During his time with Gummer and Ford Wilson is known to have worked on the  Remuera Public Library,  Auckland Railway Station, Wellington Public Library (now the City Gallery Wellington), the National War Memorial, and the National Art Gallery and Dominion Museum building in Wellington.

Department of Housing Construction
In late 1936 Wilson left Gummer and Ford to take up the position of chief architect of newly created Department of Housing Construction, which had been established by the first Labour government to undertake the construction of state rental houses.
Not only was Wilson largely responsible for its organisation and development of the new department which was responsible for not only for the design of state housing. 

Wilson employed a number of refugee European architects, including Helmut Einhorn,  Fred Farrar, Ernst Gerson, Friedrich Neumann (who anglicised his name to Frederick "Fred" Newman), and Ernst Plischke. Their previous experience with the design of mass housing in Europe influenced Wilson’s thinking and was utilised by him in developing the government’s first rental apartment blocks in the 1940s. These were designed to offer affordable rental housing for low-income individuals and families. Built in the Modernist style, the most significant in Wellington were the Berhampore State Flats, the Dixon Street Flats, the McLean State Flats, the Hanson Street Flats, and in Auckland, the Grey’s Avenue Flats and Symonds Street Flats.

The Department of Housing Construction became the Housing Division of the Ministry of Works in 1943. Wilson was its chief architect until 1948, when he was appointed assistant government architect. 

In 1946 Wilson travelled to the United States where he met architects Walter Gropius,  Carl Koch and Hugh Stubbins.

Government architect
Following the retirement of Robert Patterson, Wilson was appointed Government Architect in 1952. As government architect, Wilson was responsible for the design of government buildings, educational buildings and state housing. Major projects undertaken during his tenue were the Bledisloe State Building, the Bowen State Building, the School of Engineering building at the University of Canterbury and the University of Otago Dental School building.

He was also associated with development plans for universities and as an assessor of architectural competitions. In 1954 Wilson travelled to United States, United Kingdom and Europe. While in the United Kingdom he discussed the design of  New Zealand House in London with its architect Robert Matthew.

Death
Wilson died suddenly on 23 February 1959 in a street in Wellington. Fergus Sheppard was appointed to succeed Wilson as Government Architect.

Recognition
In 1932 he entered the R.I.B.A. Empire Victory Scholarship Competition, which was an Empire architectural award. His entry which was specially commended, was one of the three out of more than 400 entries from all British countries to be published in the journal of the Royal Institute of British Architects. Wilson was awarded the New Zealand Institute of Architects' Gold Medal in 1948 for the design of the Dixon Street State Flats.

In 1951 Wilson was made a fellow of the New Zealand Institute of Architects and in 1954 he was made an associate of the Royal Institute of British Architects. In 1953, he was awarded the Queen Elizabeth II Coronation Medal.

Wilson served on the Association of New Zealand Art Societies, the Architectural Centre Council National Historic Places Trust, the Town Planning Board, as well as on the council and executive committee of the New Zealand Institute of Architects.

As a sign of the respect with which he was held the Gordon Wilson Flats in Wellington which were under construction at the time of Wilson’s death were named after him.

Personal life
Wilson married American, Virginia "Ginny" Abigail Smith, who was just off the boat from California on 4 March 1937 at St Paul’s Cathedral Church in Wellington.  From 1940 onwards the couple lived in a house at 83 Campbell Street, in the Wellington suburb of Karori which had been designed by Wilson. They had three sons and two daughters.

Following her husband’s death his wife returned to the United States. Two of the couple's sons, Michael and Peter, became architects In California.

Works
Among the buildings which Wilson personally designed, collaborated on or supervised the design of are:

References

Further reading

External links 
 Film clip: government architect, state housing. Film clip of Gordon Wilson in the 1940s discussing the design of state houses.
 Francis Gordon Wilson 1900–1959 (Person). List of works by Gordon Wilson in the NZETC collection.
 The battle over Wellington's 'ugliest building'. Article from 2018 on the status of the Gordon Wilson Memorial Flats.
 The iconic mid-century Auckland social housing block being demolished. Article on the Upper Greys Avenue Flats.

1900 births
1959 deaths
New Zealand public servants
People from Perth, Western Australia
Australian emigrants to New Zealand
20th-century New Zealand architects
Recipients of the NZIA Gold Medal